The Slovak Extraliga, known as the Tipos Extraliga since the 2020–21 season for sponsorship reasons, is the highest-level ice hockey league in Slovakia. From 2018–19 to 2020–21, the league included one or two teams from Hungary.

Teams from the Extraliga can participate in the IIHF's annual Champions Hockey League (CHL), competing for the European Trophy. Participation is based on the strength of the various leagues in Europe (excluding the European/Asian Kontinental Hockey League). Going into the 2022–23 CHL season, the Extraliga was ranked the No. 10 league in Europe, allowing them to send their top team to compete in the CHL.

The 1993–94 season was the first for the Slovak Extraliga following the peaceful dissolution of Czechoslovakia midway through the 1992–93 Czechoslovak Extraliga seasonwhich all Slovak and Czech teams played to completion.

Game

Every regular season game is composed of three 20-minute periods, with an intermission of a maximum of 18 minutes between periods. If the game is tied following the 60-minute regulation time, a five-minute three-on-three sudden death overtime period is played.  If a game is still tied after the overtime, a shootout decides the winner of the game. In a shootout, the team that scores the most penalty shots out of five attempts wins the game. If a game is still tied after five penalty-shot rounds, the shootout continues round by round, until one team scores while the other team fails to score.

Teams

2021–22 season

Season structure
The Tipos Extraliga season is divided into a regular season from late September through the beginning of March, when teams play against each other in a pre-defined schedule, and playoffs from March to April, which is an elimination tournament at which two teams play against each other to win the best-of-seven series in order to advance to the next round. The winner of playoffs is crowned the Slovak champion, (Slovenský majster in Slovak) and receives the Vladimir Dzurilla Trophy.

Regular season
The regular season is a round-robin, where each team plays 50 games. Three points are awarded for winning in regulation time, two points for winning in overtime or a shootout, one point for losing in overtime or a shootout, and zero points for losing in regulation time. At the end of the regular season, the team that finishes with the most points is crowned the league champion. The six highest-ranked teams by points qualify directly for the playoffs. The four teams ranked 7–10 play a best-of-five series and battle for the two remaining playoffs spots. The lowest ranked team after the regular season plays in a relegation series called Play-Out against the best team from the second-tier league Slovak 1. Liga. The two teams battle to win a best-of-seven series of Play-Out to qualify for the next Tipos Extraliga season. Before the 2018–19 season, the eight highest-ranked teams qualified for the playoffs.

If two or more teams end up tied in points, the seeds are determined by the following tiebreaker format:
Head-to-head points

Play-In
Starting in the 2018–19 season, the four teams ranked 7–10 in the regular season play a best-of-five series, known as Play-In, and battle for the two remaining playoff spots. The seventh-ranked team faces the tenth-ranked team, and the eighth-ranked team faces the ninth-ranked team. The seventh-ranked team and the eighth-ranked team receive home-ice advantage and play three of the five games at their home venue if it is necessary to determine a winner of the series. The winners of the two best-of-five series take the two remaining playoffs spots.

Playoffs
The Tipos Extraliga playoffs is an elimination tournament, at which two teams battle to win a best-of-seven series in order to advance to the next round. In the first round of the playoffs (quarterfinals), the top seed faces the lowest-ranked winner of the two best-of-three series (eighth seed, ninth seed or tenth seed); the second-ranked seed faces the other winner of the two best-of-five series; the third-ranked seed faces the sixth-ranked seed; and the fourth-ranked seed faces the fifth-ranked team. In the second round (semifinals), the teams are re-seeded, with the top remaining seed playing against the lowest remaining seed, and the other two remaining teams pairing up. In the third round (finals), the two remaining teams face each other.

In each series, the higher-ranked team of the two has home-ice advantage. Four of the seven games are played at this team's home venue – the first and second, and, when necessary, the fifth and seventh games and all the other games are played at the lower-ranked team's home venue.

Play-Out (Relegation)
The lowest ranked team after the regular season plays in a relegation series called Play-Out against the winner of the second-tier league Slovak 1. Liga. The two teams battle to win a best-of-seven series of Play-Out to qualify for the next Tipos Extraliga season.

Names and sponsorship
The name of the league is leased to sponsors and changes frequently. From 1993–94 to 1997–98, it was called Extraliga, then the name changed to West Extraliga until the end of the 2000–01 season. In 2001–02, its name was Boss Extraliga. From 2002–03 to 2004–05, the name was ST Extraliga and in 2005–06 the name was T-Com Extraliga (same corporate sponsor, rebranded themselves). After starting the 2006–07 season without a sponsorship, reverting to straightforward Extraliga, the name changed midway through the season to Slovnaft Extraliga, when a general sponsorship agreement with Slovnaft was signed on 16 January 2007; this name continued through the end of the 2010–11 season. From 2011–12 to 2014–15, it carried the two part name Tipsport Extraliga and Slovnaft Play-off, reflecting a specific sponsorship arrangement for the playoffs; this name was slightly adjusted, starting with the 2015–16 season, to Tipsport Liga and Slovnaft Play-off. The current name, starting 2020–21, is Tipos Extraliga.

Previous winners

Previous Slovak Extraliga regular season winners

1994 – Dukla Trenčín
1995 – Dukla Trenčín
1996 – HC Košice
1997 – Dukla Trenčín
1998 – Slovan Bratislava
1999 – Slovan Bratislava
2000 – Slovan Bratislava
2001 – HKm Zvolen
2002 – HKm Zvolen
2003 – Slovan Bratislava
2004 – Dukla Trenčín
2005 – HKm Zvolen
2006 – HK Nitra
2007 – HC Košice
2008 – Slovan Bratislava
2009 – HC Košice
2010 – Slovan Bratislava
2011 – HC Košice
2012 – HC Košice
2013 – HKM Zvolen
2014 – HC Košice
2015 – HC Košice
2016 – HC Košice
2017 – HC '05 Banská Bystrica
2018 – HK Nitra
2019 – HC '05 Banská Bystrica
2020 – HC '05 Banská Bystrica
2021 – HKM Zvolen
2022 – Slovan Bratislava
2023 – HC Košice

Previous Slovak Extraliga playoffs winners (Slovak Champions)

1994 – Dukla Trenčín
1995 – HC Košice
1996 – HC Košice
1997 – Dukla Trenčín
1998 – Slovan Bratislava
1999 – HC Košice
2000 – Slovan Bratislava
2001 – HKm Zvolen
2002 – Slovan Bratislava
2003 – Slovan Bratislava
2004 – Dukla Trenčín
2005 – Slovan Bratislava
2006 – MsHK Žilina
2007 – Slovan Bratislava
2008 – Slovan Bratislava
2009 – HC Košice
2010 – HC Košice
2011 – HC Košice
2012 – Slovan Bratislava
2013 – HKM Zvolen
2014 – HC Košice
2015 – HC Košice
2016 – HK Nitra
2017 – HC '05 Banská Bystrica
2018 – HC '05 Banská Bystrica
2019 – HC '05 Banská Bystrica
2020 – Not held due to COVID-19 pandemic in Slovakia
2021 – HKM Zvolen
2022 – Slovan Bratislava

Video games
Teams from the league are playable in the video games EA Sports' NHL series only in NHL 2009.

See also
 Czech Extraliga
 Czechoslovak Extraliga
 List of Slovak ice hockey champions

References

External links
Official website – Tipsport liga 
SZĽH – Slovak Ice-Hockey Federation 

 
Sports leagues established in 1993
1993 establishments in Slovakia
Professional ice hockey leagues in Slovakia
Professional ice hockey leagues in Hungary
Multi-national ice hockey leagues in Europe
Multi-national professional sports leagues
Top tier ice hockey leagues in Europe